Margarita Monet (born Margarita Martirosyan; February 15, 1990) is an American singer, pianist, composer and an actress. She is the founder/ lead vocalist for the hard rock/symphonic metal band Edge Of Paradise. Known for her powerful voice and incredible range. Margarita has three full-length albums out and one EP with her band Edge Of Paradise : IMMORTAL WALTZ 2015, ALIVE 2017, UNIVERSE 2019  and THE UNKNOWN

Early life and career 

Margarita was born in Yerevan, Armenia and moved to Moscow, Russia at an early age.  She started music lessons at the age of four and quickly accelerated into a competitive and performance ready pianist. She has competed and won awards in numerous piano competitions.

At the age of 11 years old, the whole family moved to Houston, she attended High School For The Performing and Visual Arts, for musical theater. After she moved to New York after getting accepted into New York University's Tisch School Of The Arts.  At NYU she majored in Theater at the Meisner studio and minored in Music.

Margarita moved to LA in 2010 where she met Dave Bates while working on a project with a local producer. Dave was in search of a singer who had the ability to fill Robin McAuley's shoes. Soon their music partnership created tremendous results and solidified the band that took up the new name, Edge Of Paradise.

References 

Women rock singers
1990 births
Living people
American heavy metal singers
High School for the Performing and Visual Arts alumni
21st-century American women singers
21st-century American singers
Armenian emigrants to the United States
American women heavy metal singers